Woman Draped in Patterned Handkerchiefs is a 1908 British short  silent documentary film, directed by George Albert Smith as a showcase of his new Kinemacolor system, which features a woman displaying assorted tartan cloths, both draped on her body and waved semaphore-style. The patterned handkerchiefs are, according to Michael Brooke of BFI Screenonline, "presumably the same cloths featured in Tartans of Scottish Clans (1906), this time shown from various angles."

References

External links
 

1908 films
1900s British films
1900s color films
British silent short films
1900s short documentary films
Black-and-white documentary films
Films directed by George Albert Smith
Articles containing video clips
British short documentary films